Péter Vályi (25 December 1919 – 18 September 1973) was a Hungarian politician who had been the deputy chairman of the Council of Ministers, equivalent to Deputy Prime Minister from 1971 until his accidental death in 1973, and had served as Minister of Finance between 1967 and 1971.

Career
Vályi worked as a chemical engineer. He was arrested in 1945 because of his communist activities. He joined the Hungarian Communist Party in the same year. From 1948 he worked for the National Planning Board. From May 1971 onward he served as deputy chairman of the Council of Ministers (Deputy Prime Minister), second to Chairman Jenő Fock. Vályi did considerable work in connection with the reform of the economic mechanism. He was a member of the MSZMP's Central Committee from November 1970.

Death
Vályi died as the consequence of a fall suffered during a visit to the Lenin Metallurgical Works in Miskolc on 18 September 1973. In the most dangerous part of the factory he fell into the casting pit. His body was trapped between the molds and by the time he had been pulled out, his nylon suit had burnt onto his body. The CEO, who tried to help the deputy minister, also suffered burns. Vályi died in a hospital after long suffering.

Many conspiracy theories have been published after the incident. The reformist politician could have stood in the way of the political leadership of the Eastern Bloc. A few days before Vályi's death, the Polish Deputy Prime Minister, who was also a pro-Western, died when hit by a car.

References

External links
 Magyar Életrajzi Lexikon
 

1919 births
1973 deaths
People from Szombathely
Members of the Hungarian Working People's Party
Members of the Hungarian Socialist Workers' Party
Finance ministers of Hungary
Hungarian Communist Party politicians
Jewish Hungarian politicians
Accidental deaths in Hungary
20th-century Hungarian economists